Forepaugh is a populated place situated in Maricopa County, Arizona, United States. It is located along the Arizona and California Railroad.

References

Populated places in Maricopa County, Arizona